Hercules: The Legendary Journeys is a television series that was filmed in New Zealand and the United States, starring Kevin Sorbo as Hercules. It is very loosely based on the tales of the classical Greek culture hero Heracles. It ran for 111 episodes over six seasons.

It was preceded by several TV movies with the same major characters in 1994 as part of Universal Media Studios's Action Pack: in order, Hercules and the Amazon Women, Hercules and the Lost Kingdom, Hercules and the Circle of Fire, Hercules in the Underworld, and Hercules in the Maze of the Minotaur, the last of which served mostly as a "clip show" of the previous movies as a lead up to the series.

Series overview

Episodes

Television films (1994)

Season 1 (1995)

Season 2 (1995–96)

Season 3 (1996–97)

Season 4 (1997–98)

Season 5 (1998–99)

Season 6 (1999)

References

External links
 

Hercules: The Legendary Journeys